The 1951–52 Tercera División season was the 16th since its establishment.

Format 
16 clubs in 6 geographic groups (96 clubs) participated. Three withdrew before the end of the season. The 6 group winners were promoted to the Segunda División. It had been planned to reorganise the Segunda and Tercera Divisiónes but the plan was never implemented and the Promotion play-offs had no consequence.  The bottom three clubs in Groups I and II of the Segunda División were relegated and no other Tercera División clubs were promoted.

League tables

Group I

Group II

Group III

Group IV

Group V

Group VI

Promotion playoff

Group I

Group II

Season records
 Most wins: 21, España Industrial.
 Most draws: 10, Tomelloso.
 Most losses: 22, Polvorín, Igualada and Real Ávila.
 Most goals for: 90, Escoriaza.
 Most goals against: 104, Polvorín.
 Most points: 46, España Industrial.
 Fewest wins: 4, Polvorín, Igualada and Atlético Malagueño.
 Fewest draws: 1, 5 teams.
 Fewest losses: 4, Cacereño.
 Fewest goals for: 24, Atlético Malagueño.
 Fewest goals against: 24, Real Avilés.
 Fewest points: 11, Atlético Malagueño.

Notes

External links
www.rsssf.com
Research by Asociación para la Recopilación de Estadísticas del Fútbol (AREFE)

Tercera División seasons
3
Spain